KQPI (99.5 FM) is a radio station broadcasting a country music format, simulcasting KUPI 99.1 FM Idaho Falls, Idaho. Licensed to Aberdeen, Idaho, USA, the station serves the Pocatello area.  The station is currently owned by Sandhill Media Group, LLC.

References

External links

Country radio stations in the United States
QPI